Kim Min-chae (Hangul: 김민채; born 26 February 2006) is a South Korean figure skater. She is the 2022 CS Denis Ten Memorial Challenge champion.

Personal life 
Kim was born on 26 February 2006 in Seoul.

Programs

Competitive highlights 
CS: Challenger Series; JGP: Junior Grand Prix

References

External links 
 

2006 births
Living people
South Korean female single skaters
Sportspeople from Seoul
Figure skaters from Seoul